The following entries cover events related to the study of archaeology which occurred in the listed year.


1600s - 1700s - 1800s - 1900s- 2000s

1600s
1600  1601  1602  1603  1604  1605  1606  1607  1608  16091610   1611   1612   1613   1614   1615   1616   1617   1618   1619
1620   1621   1622   1623   1624   1625   1626   1627   1628   1629
1630   1631   1632   1633   1634   1635   1636   1637   1638   1639
1640   1641   1642   1643   1644   1645   1646   1647   1648   1649
1650   1651   1652   1653   1654   1655   1656   1657   1658   1659
1660   1661   1662   1663   1664   1665   1666   1667   1668   1669
1670   1671   1672   1673   1674   1675   1676   1677   1678   1679
1680   1681   1682   1683   1684   1685   1686   1687   1688   1689
1690   1691   1692   1693   1694   1695   1696   1697   1698   1699

1700s
1700  1701  1702  1703  1704  1705  1706  1707  1708  17091710   1711   1712   1713   1714   1715   1716   1717   1718   1719
1720   1721   1722   1723   1724   1725   1726   1727   1728   1729
1730   1731   1732   1733   1734   1735   1736   1737   1738   1739
1740   1741   1742   1743   1744   1745   1746   1747   1748   1749
1750   1751   1752   1753   1754   1755   1756   1757   1758   1759
1760   1761   1762   1763   1764   1765   1766   1767   1768   1769
1770   1771   1772   1773   1774   1775   1776   1777   1778   1779
1780   1781   1782   1783   1784   1785   1786   1787   1788   1789
1790   1791   1792   1793   1794   1795   1796   1797   1798   1799

1800s
1800  1801  1802  1803  1804  1805  1806  1807  1808  18091810   1811   1812   1813   1814   1815   1816   1817   1818   1819
1820   1821   1822   1823   1824   1825   1826   1827   1828   1829
1830   1831   1832   1833   1834   1835   1836   1837   1838   1839
1840   1841   1842   1843   1844   1845   1846   1847   1848   1849
1850   1851   1852   1853   1854   1855   1856   1857   1858   1859
1860   1861   1862   1863   1864   1865   1866   1867   1868   1869
1870   1871   1872   1873   1874   1875   1876   1877   1878   1879
1880   1881   1882   1883   1884   1885   1886   1887   1888   1889
1890   1891   1892   1893   1894   1895   1896   1897   1898   1899

1900s
1900   1901   1902   1903   1904   1905   1906   1907   1908   1909
1910   1911   1912   1913   1914   1915   1916   1917   1918   1919
1920   1921   1922   1923   1924   1925   1926   1927   1928   1929
1930   1931   1932   1933   1934   1935   1936   1937   1938   1939
1940   1941   1942   1943   1944   1945   1946   1947   1948   1949
1950   1951   1952   1953   1954   1955   1956   1957   1958   1959
1960   1961   1962   1963   1964   1965   1966   1967   1968   1969
1970   1971   1972   1973   1974   1975   1976   1977   1978   1979
1980   1981   1982   1983   1984   1985   1986   1987   1988   1989
1990   1991   1992   1993   1994   1995   1996   1997   1998   1999

2000s

2000   2001   2002   2003   
2004   2005   2006   2007   
2008   2009 
2010   2011   2012   2013  
2014   2015   2016   2017  
2018  2019  2020   2021
2022 2023

 
 
Y
Tables of years
Archaeology